Allen Kessler ls an American professional poker player now residing ln Las Vegas, Nevada. He is ranked 10th in All Time Total Cashes with 363 tournament cashes as recorded in the Global Poker Index. These include 69 WSOP cashes, 12 WSOP Europe cashes and 91 WSOP Circuit cashes including 3 rings and 9 cashes in the 2010 World Series of Poker, the most cashes of any player at the 2010 WSOP. Those 9 cashes include a 2nd-place finish.  Kessler is also the Heartland Poker Tour Player of the Year for 2013. His career earnings exceed $3.87 million with an excess of $1.97 million in earnings at the WSOP and WSOP Circuit combined.

Poker career
Kessler started playing poker in college and in the 1980s he spent time in Atlantic City playing slot machines. When the casinos offered poker in the 1990s, Kessler played high-stakes games with players like John Hennigan, Cyndy Violette, Nick Frangos, and Phil Ivey.

After years of experience at the cash tables he started playing tournament poker and in 2001 finished 16th in the 2001 WSOP 5K Omaha Hi-Lo Split 8 or Better.  His first final table at the WSOP came in 2005 where he finished 2nd to Todd Brunson in the $2,500 Omaha Hi-Lo.

At the 2010 World Series of Poker (WSOP), Kessler had a total of 9 cashes, setting the record for most cashes in that year's series. This included his biggest career cash of $276,485 when he finished 2nd to Frank Kassela in the $10K Seven Card Stud Hi-Lo 8 Championship. At the 2014 World Series of Poker he had 5 cashes including a final table appearance in the prestigious 50K Poker Players Championship.

Highlighted among his 15 documented live tournament wins are; Main Event Champion - 2009 Winter Bayou Poker Challenge and Main Event Champion - 2014 WSOPC at Foxwoods Casino.
 
In the 2006 L.A. Poker Classic he appeared in his first televised final table finishing 3rd in the WPT Invitiational - No Limit Hold'em event.

Kessler is the Heartland Poker Tour Player of the Year 2013. He earned this title without winning a single HPT event that year but cashing in 12 of 20 events for over $85,000, and making four final tables.

As of January 2020, his total live tournament winnings are $3,875,189.

Nickname and other activities
Kessler was given the nickname "The Complainsaw" by the first dealer who failed to deliver him a premium/playable hand back in 1993. He is known for scoffing and complaining when the cards dont fall his way. Universally despised by dealers from coast to coast, his child-like behavior at the tables has led to the nickname sticking with him. Most players understand that card distribution is rather unequitable, especially in tournament poker. But not Allen. If he's not winning when you're dealing, he will take it as a personal affront and scoff at every hand that he is dealt. 

He is a fan of playing penny slots and video poker often tweeting out photos of his notable wins. Rumor has it that he once played penny slots for 37 hours straight. 

The Mid-State Poker Tour's Main Event tournament structure was designed by Allen Kessler and is identified as "Chainsaw Approved".

The term "Chainsaw Approved" is now commonly used in the tournament poker community to refer to an event whose blind structure and fees are a good value for the player.

Kessler's complaints, along with other players, actually effected a change in the blind structure for some of the 2015 WSOP events according to an interview with Tournament Director Jack Effel.

Notes

External links
Allen Kessler Interview (audio + transcript)

American poker players
Living people
Temple University alumni
Year of birth missing (living people)